Urtatau (Urtataw) is a rural locality (a village) in Sergiopolsky Selsoviet, Davlekanovsky District, Bashkortostan, Russia. The population was 67 as of 2010. There is 1 street.

Geography 
Urtatau is located 16 km southwest of Davlekanovo (the district's administrative centre) by road. Tavrichanka is the nearest rural locality.

References 

Rural localities in Davlekanovsky District